Patricia Mungenast Smith (born c. 1953) is a former associate justice of the Supreme Court of Alabama.

Smith, born around 1953 to Andy and Norma Mungenast, was raised in a military household. She received her higher education from Troy University (1973) and Jones Law School (1976). After practicing at a law firm, Smith became the first female to serve as the Assistant District Attorney for the 18th Judicial Circuit. In 1980, she achieved another historical milestone by becoming the first female to serve as a Judge of the Shelby County Family Court. By 2004, Smith was elected as a justice of the Supreme Court of Alabama. She remained on the bench until her retirement in 2011.

See also 

 Supreme Court of Alabama
 List of justices of the Alabama Supreme Court
 List of first women lawyers and judges in Alabama

References 

Justices of the Supreme Court of Alabama
Troy University alumni
Shelby County, Alabama
1950s births
Living people
21st-century American women judges
21st-century American judges